State Trunk Highway 153 (often called Highway 153, STH-153 or WIS 153) is a  state highway in Marathon and Shawano counties in central Wisconsin, United States, that runs in east–west from Spencer to Tigerton, passing through Mosinee and Stratford. The highway was originally designated in 1925 and was extended sometime between 1948 and 1956.

Route description

The highway begins at its intersection with WIS 13 and 153rd Road north of Stratford and continues eastward from it. It passes by WIS 97 (North Weber Avenue) in Stratford and various small communities before it enters Moisinee. The highway runs through downtown Mosinee and intersects with County Trunk Highway B (CTH-B, Main Street) and continues east on Main Street before running south on Old Highway 51 for a short distance before continuing east, passing through an interchange with Interstate 39 (I-39) and US Highway 51 (US 51) and by Central Wisconsin Airport. The highway runs south through a short concurrency with CTH-J before running east from it. It later runs north towards Mission Lake Road and continues east along its alignment, intersecting WIS 49 before ending at US 45 in the town of Wittenberg.

History
The WIS 153 designation first appeared on the state highway map in 1925 as an unpaved route from WIS 97 in Stratford to WIS 10 in Mosinee. The section west of WIS 97 was signed as CTH-M. In 1927, the same year WIS 10 was redesignated as US 51, a section east of US 51 was signed as CTH-K. In 1939, a bill proposing an extension of the highway was heard in the Wisconsin Legislature, though this was indefinitely postponed. This extension would end up being built sometime between 1948 and 1956, extending the highway west along the CTH-M (By then CTH-B) alignment to WIS 13 and east along the CTH-K alignment to WIS 49. The original section of the highway was also paved around this time.

Major intersections

See also

References

External links

153
Transportation in Marathon County, Wisconsin
Transportation in Shawano County, Wisconsin